Jenny Eugenia Nyström (13 or 15 June 1854 in Kalmar, Sweden – 17 January 1946 in Stockholm) was a painter and illustrator mainly known as the creator of the Swedish image of the jultomte on Christmas cards and magazine covers, thus linking the Swedish version of Santa Claus to the gnomes and tomtar of Scandinavian folklore.

Background 
Her father was a school teacher and piano teacher, and also the cantor of the Kalmar Castle Church. When Jenny Nyström was eight years old, the family moved to Gothenburg, where her father had found a better paying teaching job.

She studied at the Kjellbergska flickskolan.  In 1865 she started in the Gothenburg art school Göteborgs Musei-, Rit- och Målarskola, today known as Konsthögskolan Valand, and in 1873 she was admitted to the Royal Swedish Academy of Arts in Stockholm, where she studied for eight years. Thanks to a scholarship, this was followed by studies in Paris 1882–1886, at Académie Colarossi and Académie Julian.

Career

While in Paris, Nyström discovered the booming postcard market, and tried to persuade the Swedish publishing house Bonnier to start producing postcards, but they declined. Lille Viggs äventyr på julafton  ("Little Vigg's Adventures on Christmas Eve"), written by the author Viktor Rydberg inspired Nyström. She made drawings accompanying this tale. Viktor Rydberg saw them and suggested the Bonniers publishing company to release the book. After they declined,  publisher S. A. Hedlund released it in 1871. The short Christmas tale for all ages was widely printed and has since become a Christmas classic in Sweden. Jenny Nyström eventually became Sweden's most productive painter and illustrator. For many years, her illustrations were distributed by Strålin & Persson AB in Falun.

In 1887, at the age of 33, she married medical student Daniel Stoopendaal (1853-1927), brother of fellow artists Henrik Wilhelm Johan Stoopendaal (1846 - 1906), Ferdinand Jacob Stoopendaal (1850-), and Georg Vilhelm Stoopendaal (1866-1953). Due to tuberculosis Daniel was never able to finish his studies and take up his intended profession. It was instead up to Jenny to support herself, her husband and their son through her artistry, while Daniel handled her business affairs. He died in 1927.

In 1933 her son, Curt Nyström Stoopendahl (1893-1965), followed in her footsteps and also became a popular postcard and poster artist, staying very close to his mother's artistic style. Even his signature, “Curt Nyström”, looked like his mother's. Likewise, her brother-in-law, Georg Stoopendaal, already in the beginning of the 19th century found postcards to be a good source of income, unlike his more serious paintings, and his Christmas cards are also clearly inspired by Jenny Nyström's.

Santa Claus and Christmas
Nyström created the Swedish image of the jultomte on numerous Christmas cards and magazine covers, thus linking the Swedish version of Santa Claus to the gnomes of Scandinavian folklore.

Selected illustrations
Fornnordiska sagor,  Albert Ulrik Bååth, author (1886) (early Norse tales)
Den poetiska Eddan,  Nils Frederick Sander, author (1893) (the poetic Edda) 
Barnkammarens Bok (Stockholm: Fahlcrantz & Co. 1903) (the nursery book)

See also
Haddon Sundblom

Gallery

References

Other sources
Forsberg Warringer, Gunnel  Jenny Nyström: konstnärinna (1992)
Forsberg Warringer, Gunnel Jenny Nyström: målaren och illustratören (1996)

Further reading

External links

Jenny Nyström on the Kalmar County Museum website 
Jenny Nyström Christmas cards 
Jenny Eugenia Nyström
 

1854 births
1946 deaths
People from Kalmar
Swedish illustrators
Swedish women illustrators
Swedish children's book illustrators
Postcard artists
Académie Julian alumni
Académie Colarossi alumni
19th-century Swedish painters
20th-century Swedish painters
Burials at Norra begravningsplatsen
Swedish women painters